Abanoskhevi is a village in Mtskheta-Mtianeti region, Georgia. It is part of the Lapanaantkari commune, Dusheti municipality, with the population of 399, mostly (99%) ethnic Georgians, as of the 2014 census.

Abanoskhevi is located on both banks of the Abanoskhevi river, a left tributary of the Aragvi, at 580 meters above sea level, 13 km. southeast of the town of Dusheti. The earliest archaeologically confirmed traces of human habitat on modern Abanoskhevi's territory date back to the Neolithic era,  4,000 BC.

See also
 Mtskheta-Mtianeti

References

Villages in Mtskheta-Mtianeti